Bettina Herlitzius  (born 8 July 1960 in Bad Salzuflen, North Rhine-Westphalia) is a  German politician, specifically a Green Party representative in the Bundestag.

Political career

.  Her initial term began in 2007 but she was re-elected as MP in September 2009.  She is currently Green Party's spokesperson on tourism and housing policy. Her political career so far:-

 Member of the Bündnis 90/Die Grünen since 1989.
 Member of the Rhineland Regional Council (until September 2007 Group vice-president).
 Member and vice chairman of the Regional Cologne.
 Members of the Bundestag since September 2007.  Tourism and housing sector Group spokesperson, coordinator for the Federal Transport Infrastructure Plan and Member of the LAG Transport committee.

Like fellow party member Gerhard Schick, Herlitzius is a committed environmentalist and the pair have taken steps to introduce environmental taxes within the German Parliament.

Education & Work History

After school Herlitzius studied architecture at the RWTH Aachen in Aachen where she graduated from in 1989.  She then worked as an independent architect until 1993 when she began her Referendariat or Training programme at the State Building Authority in the Ministry of Construction and Housing.  After completing her final state exams she became director of the Office of Traffic, housing, building and road construction for Aachen county.

Personal life

Herlitzius is openly lesbian and she has championed equal rights for LGBT couples since the 1990s. She lives with her partner in a civil union and has one son.

References

External links 
 Website by Bettina Herlitzius
 Biography in the German Bundestag
 Lebenslauf bei der Bundestagsfraktion Bündnis 90/Die Grünen

1960 births
Living people
People from Bad Salzuflen
Lesbian politicians
Members of the Bundestag for North Rhine-Westphalia
LGBT members of the Bundestag
German LGBT rights activists
Female members of the Bundestag
21st-century German women politicians
Members of the Bundestag 2009–2013
Members of the Bundestag for Alliance 90/The Greens
21st-century LGBT people